Eritrean cuisine is based on Eritrea's native culinary traditions, but also arises from social interchanges with other regions. The local cuisine shares similarities with the cuisine of neighboring Ethiopia and the cuisines from other African countries in the region.

Overview
Eritrean cuisine shares similarities with surrounding countries' cuisines; however, the cuisine has its unique characteristics.

The main traditional food in Eritrean cuisine is tsebhi (stew), served with injera (flatbread made from teff, wheat, or sorghum and hilbet (paste made from legumes; mainly lentil and faba beans). 
A typical traditional Eritrean dish consists of injera accompanied by a spicy stew, which frequently includes beef, goat, lamb or fish.

Overall, Eritrean cuisine strongly resembles that of neighboring Ethiopia, although Eritrean cooking tends to feature more seafood than Ethiopian cuisine on account of its coastal location. Eritrean dishes are also frequently lighter in texture than Ethiopian meals as they tend to employ less seasoned butter and spices and more tomatoes, as in tsebhi dorho.

Additionally, owing to its colonial history, cuisine in Eritrea features more Italian influences than are present in Ethiopian cooking, including more pasta specials and greater use of curry powders and cumin. People in Eritrea likewise tend to drink coffee  Christian Eritreans also drink sowa (a bitter fermented barley) and mies (a fermented honey beverage), while Muslim Eritreans abstain from drinking alcohol.

Common foods and dishes

When eating injera diners generally share food from a large tray placed in the centre of a low dining table. Numerous pieces of injera are layered on this tray and topped with various spicy stews. Diners break into the section of injera in front of them, tearing off pieces and dipping them into the stews.

The stews that accompany injera are usually made from beef, chicken, lamb, goat, mutton, or vegetables. Most Eritreans, with the exception of the Saho, like their food spicy and hot. Berbere, a mixture that consists of a variety of common and unusual herbs and spices, accompanies almost all dishes. Stews include zigni, made with beef; dorho tsebhi, made with chicken; alicha, a vegetable dish made without berbere; and shiro, a purée of various legumes.

When making ga'at, a ladle is used to make an indentation in the dough, which is then filled with a mixture of berbere and melted butter,  and surrounded by milk or yogurt. When dining, a small piece of ga'at is dipped into the berbere and the butter sauce, and then into the milk or yogurt.

Influenced by its past as an Italian colony, Eritrean cuisine also features unique interpretations of classic Italian dishes. Among these specialties are pasta sauces spiced with berbere.

Breakfast 
 Kitcha fit-fit, a dish made from pieces of a hearty pancake tossed in clarified butter and spices. The pancake is usually made of different types of flour, or dry porridge mixed with water and other seasonings. The heat can be adjusted by pouring more or less berbere (the hot spice) on the kitcha when it is finished. Normally served for breakfast with a side of yogurt or sour milk.
 Fit-fit, made with torn up pieces of injera and usually leftover stew. It can also be made with a mixture of onions, berbere, tomatoes, jalapeños and butter instead of leftover stews. Also called fir-fir.

 Ga'at or akelet, a porridge made of flour and water, served in a bowl with an indentation made in the center where clarified butter and berbere are mixed; yogurt is normally put on the sides surrounding it. It is similar and related to other stiff African porridge dishes like ugali, pap and fufu.
 Shahan ful, sauteed and mashed fava beans, served with onions, tomatoes, jalapeños, cumin, yogurt and olive oil. It is normally eaten with pieces of bread dipped in the dish to scoop out the bean mixture.
 Panettone; due to Italian influence on Eritrea, this bread is commonly served with tea or during the coffee ceremony.

Lunch/dinner 
Most dishes common to Eritrea are either meat-based or vegetable-based stews that are served over the spongy, fermented bread injera.
 Tsebhi/Zigni—a spicy stew made with lamb, mutton, cubes of beef or ground beef and berbere  
 Dorho—a spicy stew made with berbere and a whole chicken 
 Qulwa/Tibsi—sauteed meat, onions, and berbere served with a sauce 
 Alicha—a non-berbere dish made with potatoes, green beans, carrots, green peppers, and turmeric 
 Shiro—a stew made with ground chickpea flour, onions and tomatoes 
 Birsen—lentils, often cooked with onions, spices, and tomatoes. This curry can be made with or without berbere. 
 Hamli—sauteed spinach, garlic and onions

Beverages
Suwa is the name for the home-brewed beer common in Eritrea. It is made from roasted corn, barley, and other grain and is flavored with gesho, a type of buckthorn leaf. The beverage is often made for celebrations; a sweet honey wine (called mies) is also commonly served. The coffee ceremony is one of the most important and recognizable parts of Eritrean cultures. Coffee is offered when visiting friends, during festivities, or as a daily staple of life. If coffee is politely declined, then tea will most likely be served.

Even though Eritrea has a tradition of coffee drinking for centuries, Italian-style coffee like espresso and cappuccino are extremely common in Eritrea, served in practically every bar and coffee shop in the capital Asmara.

The biggest brewery in the country is Asmara Brewery, built 1939 under the name Melotti. The brewery today produces a range of beverages. A popular beverage that is common during festivities is Eritrean-style Sambuca; in Tigrinya it is translated to areki.

List of common Italian Eritrean dishes or food
 Eritrean-style lasagna
 Cotoletta alla milanese (Milano cutlet)
 Capretto
 Spaghetti bolognese (pasta al sugo e berbere)
 Frittata
 Panettone
 Pasta al forno
 Pizza
 Gelato
 Panna cotta

See also
 List of African cuisines
 Italian Eritrean cuisine

References

External links
Eritrean food practices

 
East African cuisine